The Little Brevoort River is a  river on the Upper Peninsula of Michigan in the United States. It flows generally southeast to Brevoort Lake, the outlet of which is the Brevoort River, flowing to Lake Michigan.

See also
List of rivers of Michigan

References

Michigan  Streamflow Data from the USGS

Rivers of Michigan
Tributaries of Lake Michigan